Supot Jodjam, born March 2, 1990) is a Thai professional footballer who plays as a forward for Thai League 3 club Chanthaburi.

International career
After the outstanding performance with Krabi F.C. in 2017 season. He received call-up for Thailand in a friendly match against Myanmar and Kenya. In March, 2018 he was in the squad of Thailand for 2018 King's Cup, but did not make an appearance.

International

Honours

Club
PT Prachuap FC
 Thai League Cup (1) : 2019

References

External links

1990 births
Living people
Supot Jodjam
Supot Jodjam
Association football forwards
Supot Jodjam
Supot Jodjam
Supot Jodjam
Supot Jodjam
Supot Jodjam
Supot Jodjam
Supot Jodjam
Supot Jodjam
Supot Jodjam
Supot Jodjam